The 2008–09 season of Hertha BSC began on 17 July 2008 with a UEFA Cup first round qualifying march against Nistru Otaci from Moldova and ended on 23 May 2009, the last matchday of the Bundesliga, with a match against Karlsruher SC. Hertha were eliminated in the second round of the DFB Pokal, and the group phase the UEFA Cup. They finished fourth in the Bundesliga, qualifying for the UEFA Europa League.

Players

First-team squad
Squad at end of season

Transfers

Summer

In:

Out:

Winter

In:

Out:

Statistics

Goalscorers

International appearances

Results

UEFA Cup

First qualifying round

Second qualifying round

First round

Group stage

DFB-Pokal

Bundesliga

References

Notes

Hertha BSC seasons
Hertha BSC